Once Upon a Time is the sixth extended play (EP) by South Korean girl group Lovelyz. The album was released on May 20, 2019 by Woollim Entertainment and distributed by Kakao M. The album contains six tracks, including the lead single "Beautiful Days".

Background and release
On May 8, Woollim Entertainment released the concept picture for  Once Upon a Time along with the release date on May 20. They start releasing the individual teaser picture for the album in the next day through the group's official accounts on Twitter and Facebook. The short version teaser of the title track was uploaded in YouTube and Twitter on May 14.

The title track "Beautiful Days" was revealed with the release of the album's tracklist on May 16. The next day, Lovelyz released a longer version of the music video teaser for "Beautiful Days". Their EP officially released online and physically on May 20 along with their comeback showcase.

Composition
Billboard's Tamar Herman described the lead single "Beautiful Days (When We Were Us)" as a bright and airy synth-pop track with quirky retro synths. Lyrically it tells the story of the most beautiful time.

Track listing

Charts

References

2019 EPs
Lovelyz albums
Korean-language EPs
Woollim Entertainment EPs